José Luis Dibildox Martín (20 July 1943 – 31 August 2018) was a Mexican Roman Catholic bishop.

Dibildox Martín was born in Mexico and was ordained to the priesthood in 1968. He served as bishop of the Roman Catholic Diocese of Tarahumara, Mexico, from 1993 to 2003 and then as bishop of the Roman Catholic Diocese of Tampico, Mexico, from 2003 until he resigned in 2018.

Notes

1943 births
2018 deaths
21st-century Roman Catholic bishops in Mexico
20th-century Roman Catholic bishops in Mexico
People from Chihuahua (state)